Enok (Eeno) Pusa (1 August 1888, Pyhäjärvi Vpl - 9 April 1975) was a Finnish farmer and politician. He was a member of the Parliament of Finland, representing the Social Democratic Party of Finland (SDP) from 1945 to 1951 and from 1955 to 1958 and the Social Democratic Union of Workers and Smallholders (TPSL) from 1961 to 1962.

References

1888 births
1975 deaths
People from Priozersky District
People from Viipuri Province (Grand Duchy of Finland)
Social Democratic Party of Finland politicians
Social Democratic Union of Workers and Smallholders politicians
Members of the Parliament of Finland (1945–48)
Members of the Parliament of Finland (1948–51)
Members of the Parliament of Finland (1954–58)
Members of the Parliament of Finland (1958–62)
Finnish people of World War II
Finnish farmers